BMJ Best Practice is an online decision-support tool for use at the point of care. It was created in 2009 by The BMJ.

Development
The BMJ launched BMJ Best Practice in 2009.

About BMJ Best Practice
Ranked one of the best clinical decision support tools for health professionals worldwide*, BMJ Best Practice gives you the latest evidence-based information on diagnosis, prognosis, treatment, and prevention, whenever and wherever you need it. 

The only point of care tool to feature a dedicated Comorbidities Manager, BMJ Best Practice enables you to treat the whole patient using the latest evidence-based methodology and expert opinion.

This clinical decision support tool is particularly useful for medical students, junior doctors, multidisciplinary team members (such as nurses and pharmacists), specialists working outside of their specialty, and primary care practitioners.

Healthcare professionals 
BMJ Best Practice takes healthcare professionals quickly and accurately to the latest clinical information, whenever and wherever they need it. 

Our step by step guidance on diagnosis, prognosis, treatment and prevention is updated daily using robust evidence based methodology and expert opinion. We are the only point of care tool to support the management of single conditions and patients with more complex comorbidities. We support healthcare professionals to treat the whole patient.

BMJ Best Practice provides fast and easy access to the latest clinical information. Supporting those who make diagnosis, treatment and management decisions.

The clinical information in BMJ Best Practice is exactly right for generalists, junior doctors and the wider multidisciplinary team - covering over 90% of the most commonly presenting conditions in both the primary and secondary care settings.

Our unique Comorbidities Manager provides guidance on the treatment of a patient’s acute condition alongside their pre-existing comorbidities.

As a true point-of-care tool, the latest clinical information is accessible easily and quickly via our website or app. Our guidance is uniquely structured around the patient consultation with advice on symptom evaluation, test ordering and treatment approach.

Medical students and academic institutions 
BMJ Best Practice provides students with the information and tools they need to meet the changing and complex needs of patients. It also supports educators in preparing students for the next stage of their careers.

It is the only point of care tool that supports the management of the whole patient by including guidance on the treatment of a patient’s acute condition, alongside their pre-existing comorbidities through our Comorbidities Manager.

Rapid advances in research, new evidence and continually updated guidelines can make it challenging for both medical schools and students to keep pace with the latest information. Alongside having to master large amounts of information, medical students are short of time and likely feeling under pressure, particularly when making the transition to medical practice.

With BMJ Best Practice, medical students and educators can have access to the latest evidence-based research, guidelines and expert opinion. BMJ Best Practice covers all key specialities with over800 disease-based topics. This provides an excellent learning resource for case-based teaching.

Students are able to learn from real-life case studies and case histories to help them translate their knowledge to real-life situations. For educators, this tool can save significant time in the preparation of teaching materials. And for students, BMJ Best Practice reduces the time spent consulting multiple resources.

The BMJ Best Practice Comorbidities Manager helps students understand how to competently and confidently manage a patient’s multiple chronic conditions, and implement a personal, patient-centred approach to care.

From enabling students to work through complex scenarios, to preparing them for placements and supporting their learning on the wards, BMJ Best Practice expands students’ knowledge beyond single conditions and helps them to integrate their learning into the real world of clinical practice.

Impact and research 
Since BMJ Best Practice was launched in 2009, we have committed ourselves to a program of continuous evaluation and improvement. As a result, there is now extensive evidence of the effectiveness of BMJ Best Practice in clinical decision support and improving clinical care. Find out more about BMJ Best Practice and it's impact.

*In a 2016 article published in the Journal of Medical Internet Research, BMJ Best Practice received maximum scores for strength of volume, editorial quality, and evidence-based methodology.

Product development 
At BMJ we have a user-centered product development process. In order to ensure we remain relevant to our users and customers, we continuously improve our product based on research and feedback. We define our priorities using an “outside-in” approach, which means that we enhance the product based on what our customers and our users tell us they need and want.

Access 
BMJ Best Practice offers both personal and institutional subscriptions to the tool. Only institutional subscriptions are available to purchase in the United States and Canada. All institutional subscriptions include onsite and remote access as well as access to the mobile app for iOS and Android devices.

References

External links
BMJ Best Practice Website

Evidence-based medicine
British medical websites
Medical databases
Online databases